Santa Fe de Nuevo México (shortened as Nuevo México or Nuevo Méjico, and translated as New Mexico in English) was a Kingdom of the Spanish Empire and New Spain, and later a territory of independent Mexico. The first capital was San Juan de los Caballeros (at San Gabriel de Yungue-Ouinge) from 1598 until 1610, and from 1610 onward the capital was La Villa Real de la Santa Fe de San Francisco de Asís.

The name of "New Mexico", the capital in Santa Fe, the gubernatorial office at the Palace of the Governors, vecino citizen-soldiers, and rule of law were retained as the New Mexico Territory and later state of New Mexico became part of the United States. The New Mexican citizenry, primarily consisting of Hispano, Pueblo, Navajo, Apache, and Comanche peoples, became citizens of the United States as a result of the Treaty of Guadalupe Hidalgo (1848).

 is often incorrectly believed to have taken its name from the post-independent nation of Mexico. The term "New Mexico" first appears in the Crónica Mexicayotl as an Aztec legend of a mystical empire at the center of the Seven Cities of Gold.

Geography

Nuevo México was centered on the upper valley of the Rio Grande (Río Bravo del Norte): from the crossing point of Oñate on the river south of Ciudad Juárez, it extended north, encompassing an area that included most of the present-day U.S. state of New Mexico. It had variably defined borders, and included sections of present-day U.S. states: western Texas, southern Colorado, southwestern Kansas, and the Oklahoma panhandle. Actual Spanish settlements were centered at Santa Fe, and extended north to Taos pueblo and south to Albuquerque. Except for the first decade of the province's existence, its capital was in the foothills of the Sangre de Cristo Mountains at the ancient city of La Villa Real de la Santa Fe de San Francisco de Asís (modern day Santa Fe).

Regions and municipalities 
Many of these regions are now U.S. counties and metropolitan areas.

History

Spanish colonial province

16th century
In 1536 the legendary explorers Álvar Núñez Cabeza de Vaca and Estevanico, and two other men, survived an ill-fated expedition that wrecked on the Texas coast. For 8 years they wandered across what is today northern Mexico and the Southwest United States. In 1539 Fray Marcos de Niza led an expedition north from Mexico City. He caught glimpse of a Zuni town in the distance, probably Hawikuh, and returned to Mexico City claiming it might have been one of the fabled Seven Cities of Gold. The disappearance of Estevanico in the region prompted future expeditions to be more heavily armed, and far more cautious. 1540-1542 with Marcos de Niza's tales in mind, Francisco Vázquez de Coronado began the most ambitious expedition. Fears caused by rumors surrounding Estevanico's disappearance eventually led to tensions underlying the Tiguex War. In two years the Coronado expedition journeyed from present day Mexico throughout the Southwest United States and as far east as Kansas.

1581-1582 Fray Augustin Rodriguez, two other friers, and a few soldiers and servants walked across much of present day New Mexico seeking converts. 

1590-1591 An order had arrived from Spain requiring all expeditions to be authorized by the crown. But Lt.Gov. Gaspar Castano de Sosa of Nuevo Leon launched an expedition on his own authority. He planned to start a colony in New Mexico and persuade the viceroy to accept it after the fact. Pursued through New Mexico, he was arrested and taken back to Mexico City.

On July 12, 1598, Don Juan de Oñate Salazar established the New Spain colony of Santa Fe de Nuevo Méjico at the new village of San Juan de los Caballeros adjacent to the Ohkay Owingeh Pueblo at the confluence of the Río Bravo (Rio Grande) and the Río Chama.  The expedition had been authorized by Philip II to survey the region. Though the Spanish believed that cities of gold such as Tenochtitlan of the Aztecs, whom they had previously conquered, lay to the north in the unexplored territory, the major goal was to spread Catholicism. Other expeditions had taken place before Oñate's 1598 expedition. He was unable to find any riches, however. As governor, he mingled with the Pueblo people and was responsible for the establishment of Spanish rule in the area. Oñate served as the first governor of the Nuevo México Province from 1598 to 1610. He hoped to make it a separate viceroyalty from New Spain in an original agreement made in 1595, but the terms failed when the Viceroy changed hands in 1596. After a two-year delay and lengthy vetting by the new viceroy, Oñate was finally allowed to cross the Rio Grande River into modern day Texas and New Mexico.

17th century
Most of the Spanish missions in Nuevo México were established during the early 17th century with varying degrees of success and failure, oftentimes building directly atop ancient pueblo ruins, and in the centers of pueblos. The encounter between different worlds-Native and Spanish-took place all across New Mexico, but especially at the missions. They were small communities, centers of Spanish religious and economic life, and a permanent intrusion into Pueblo ways and beliefs. Here the clash of faiths, customs, and people was immediate, personal, and sometimes bitter and violent. At missions across New Mexico, Franciscan priests baptized thousands of Native Americans in the 1600s, mostly Pueblo people. The missionaries commanded new converts to take part in Catholic services and rituals. They also destroyed Pueblo religious objects, banned ceremonies, and persecuted holy men. Despite the spread of Catholicism across the province, Pueblo men and women worshiped in secret and their traditional faith endured.

Some pueblos were friendly to the foreigners, but after cultural differences and the banishment of local religions, tensions against the Spanish rose significantly. After compounding misdeeds and overbearing taxes by the Spanish invaders, the indigenous communities rebelled in what is now referred to as the Pueblo Revolt of 1680. This rebellion saw the Spanish expelled from Nuevo México for a period of 12 years and the pueblo people were able to regain lost lands. They returned to battle against the Spanish who sought restoration in 1692 of the conquered holdings. The reoccupation of Santa Fe was accomplished by Diego de Vargas. The province came under the jurisdiction of the Real Audiencia of Guadalajara, with oversight by the Viceroy of New Spain at Mexico City.

18th century
In 1777, with the creation of the Commandancy General of the Provincias Internas, the Nuevo México Province was removed from the oversight of the Viceroy and placed solely in the jurisdiction of the Commandant General of the Provincias Internas. This caused much unrest, due to the sudden lack of representation in Santa Fe for the region of Nuevo México.

Mexican territory

The province remained in Spanish control until Mexico's declaration of independence in 1821. Under the 1824 Constitution of Mexico, it became the federally administered Territory of New Mexico.

The part of the former province east of the Rio Grande was claimed by the Republic of Texas which won its independence in 1836. This claim was disputed by Mexico. In 1841, the Texans sent the Texan Santa Fe Expedition, ostensibly for trade but with hopes of occupying the claimed area, but the expedition was captured by New Mexican troops under New Mexico governor Manuel Armijo.

American territory

The United States inherited the unenforced claim to the east bank with the Texas Annexation in 1845. The U.S. Army under Stephen Kearny occupied the territory in 1846 during the Mexican–American War, a provisional government was established, and Mexico recognized its loss to the United States in 1848 with the Mexican Cession in the Treaty of Guadalupe Hidalgo.

Texas continued to claim the eastern part, but never succeeded in establishing control except in El Paso. However, in the Compromise of 1850 Texas accepted $10 million in exchange for its claim to areas within and north of the present boundaries of New Mexico and the Texas panhandle.

Presidents Zachary Taylor and Abraham Lincoln both proposed that New Mexico immediately become a state to sidestep political conflict over slavery in the territories. As the already established rule of law passed from New Spain and Mexico within New Mexico already outlawed slavery, as was the legal precedent with genízaros.

New Mexico became a U.S. state in 1912.

Historic population

See also

 Ancient Pueblo peoples
 Apache people
 Cuisine of the Southwestern United States
 History of New Mexico
 Hispanos (Californios, Genízaros, and Tejanos)
 Hispanos of New Mexico
 Navajo people
 New Mexican cuisine
 New Mexican Spanish
 New Mexico Territory
 New Mexico
 New Mexico music
 Pueblo
 Puebloan people
 Pueblo music
 Pueblo Revolt
 Spanish governors of New Mexico
 Spanish missions in New Mexico

Notes

References

01
New Spain
Colonial Mexico
Colonial United States (Spanish)
Former states of Mexico
Independent Mexico

Pre-statehood history of Texas
Pre-statehood history of Colorado
Pre-statehood history of Kansas
Pre-statehood history of Oklahoma
Pre-statehood history of Utah
16th century in New Mexico
17th century in New Mexico
18th century in New Mexico
States and territories established in 1598
1598 establishments in New Spain
States and territories disestablished in 1821
1821 disestablishments in New Spain
States and territories disestablished in 1846
1846 disestablishments in Mexico
Historical regions